John Thomas Henry Colman (14 January 1887 – 28 September 1965) was a New Zealand rugby union player. A utility back and wing-forward, Colman represented  at a provincial level either side of World War I, and was a member of the New Zealand national side, the All Blacks, in 1907 and 1908. He played six  matches for the All Blacks including four internationals.

Colman was a blacksmith. He died in Hāwera in 1965 and was buried in Hāwera Cemetery.

References

1887 births
1965 deaths
Rugby union players from Hāwera
New Zealand rugby union players
New Zealand international rugby union players
Taranaki rugby union players
Rugby union wing-forwards
Rugby union wings
Rugby union fullbacks
Rugby union scrum-halves
Rugby union fly-halves
Burials at Hawera Cemetery